The Naco Formation is a geologic formation in Arizona. It preserves fossils dating back to the Pennsylvanian subperiod.

Fossils from the Kohls Ranch locality of Gila County, Arizona, include bivalve and gastropod molluscs, brachiopods, bryozoans, crinoids, cnidarians and sharks teeth.

See also

 List of fossiliferous stratigraphic units in Arizona
 Paleontology in Arizona

References

 

Geologic formations of Arizona
Carboniferous Arizona
Pennsylvanian Series
Carboniferous System of North America
Carboniferous southern paleotropical deposits